Jobindex is a job portal, founded in 1996 by Kaare Danielsen. 

Originally made for the Danish market, the company has since expanded to have sites in 3 other countries. 

Jobindex maintains Dansk Jobindex, an index on the number of Danish job postings.

See also
 Employment website

References

External links 
 Jobindex.dk 
 Dansk Jobindex 

Employment websites
Online companies of Denmark
Service companies based in Copenhagen
Business services companies established in 1996
Companies based in Copenhagen Municipality